The Prisoner is the seventh Herbie Hancock album, recorded and released in 1969 for the Blue Note label, his final project for the label before moving to Warner Bros. Records. It is dedicated to the memory of Dr. Martin Luther King Jr., who had been assassinated the previous year. Hancock suggested at the time that he had been able to get closer to his real self with this music than on any other previous album. Participating musicians include tenor saxophonist Joe Henderson, trumpeter Johnny Coles (on flugelhorn), trombonist Garnett Brown, flautist Hubert Laws, bassist Buster Williams and drummer  Albert “Tootie” Heath. Hancock praised flute player Laws, suggesting that he was one of the finest flautists in classical or jazz music.

Composition
Like his ambitious Speak Like a Child, The Prisoner purports to stand as a "social statement written in music". The title track seeks to express "how black people have been imprisoned for a long time." The piece was first heard live in 1968, during a performance at the University of California Jazz Festival. "Firewater" represents 'the social duality of the oppressor and the oppressed: the fire symbolises the heat in violence and (abuse of) power, whilst the feeling of water recalls Martin Luther King. "He Who Lives in Fear" also alludes to King, since he "had to live in an atmosphere charged with intimidation". (Disappointingly, perhaps, given the ambitions Herbie seems to have expressed for the tune, an early
arrangement was used as the musical theme for a Silva Thins cigarette TV commercial.) Continuing the album's apparent theme, the "Promise of the Sun" symbolises "how the sun promises life and freedom to all living things, and yet blacks are not yet free."

Track listing
All compositions by Herbie Hancock, except where noted.

"I Have a Dream" – 10:58
"The Prisoner" – 7:57
"Firewater" (Buster Williams) – 7:33
"He Who Lives in Fear" – 6:51
"Promise of the Sun" – 7:52

Bonus tracks on CD reissue
"The Prisoner" [Alternate Take] – 5:47
"Firewater" [Alternate Take] (Buster Williams) – 8:38

Recorded on April 18 (#2, 4, 6), April 21 (#1) and April 23 (#3, 5, 7), 1969.

Personnel
Herbie Hancock – acoustic piano, electric piano
Johnny Coles – flugelhorn
Garnett Brown – trombone
Joe Henderson – tenor saxophone, alto flute
Buster Williams – bass
Tootie Heath – drums
Tony Studd – bass trombone (1, 2, 4)
Jack Jeffers – bass trombone (3, 5)
Hubert Laws – flute (1, 2, 4)
Jerome Richardson – bass clarinet (1, 2, 4), flute (3, 5)
Romeo Penque – bass clarinet (3, 5)

References

1969 albums
Herbie Hancock albums
Albums produced by Duke Pearson
Blue Note Records albums
albums recorded at Van Gelder Studio